Maurice Fingercwajg also Mojsze, Fingercweig (25 December 1923 in Warsaw – 21 February 1944 in Mont Valérien), was a volunteer soldier in the French liberation army FTP-MOI and a member of the group of Missak Manouchian. He  was one of the resistance fighters shot at Fort Mont Valérien.

Biography 
Fingercwajg was born on 25 December 1923 in Warsaw, Poland. He was less than three years old when his parents settled in Paris. His father, a tailor, worked hard to feed his family. The young Maurice went to school and could have been a happy child were it not for the loss of his mother at the age of ten. Despite his youth, he worked as an upholsterer. Fingercwajg's elder brother Jacques was a member of the Jeunesse Communiste and influenced him greatly. In 1940 Fingercwajg in his turn joined the Jeunesse Communiste, where he became very active.

When the second Jewish detachment of the FTP immigrés was formed in the spring of 1942, Maurice was one of the first fighters. His bravery and devotion led to his being transferred to the elite derailment teams under the command of Missak Manouchian, where he carried out many audacious operations.

Fingercwajg's father and two brothers, Jacques and Léon, were deported during the great round-ups of Jews; he was left alone in the world and with the antifascist fighters as his only family. In November 1943, he was arrested along with his leader, Manouchian, and handed over with his other brothers in arms to the tribunal known as the procès des 23 (trial of the 23). Sentenced to death, he was shot at the Fort Mont Valérien on 21 February 1944.

Affiche rouge
Fingercwajg's name appeared on the Affiche Rouge German propaganda poster, with the caption Fingercwajg, Juif polonais, 3 attentats, 5 déraillements (Fingercwajg, Polish Jew, 3 attacks, 5 derailments).

See also
 Main-d'œuvre immigrée 
 Francs-tireurs et partisans - Main-d'œuvre immigrée 
 Affiche rouge 
 Brigades Spéciales 
 Geheime Feld Polizei

Bibliography
 FFI - FTPF, Pages de gloire des vingt-trois, Immigration, 1951.

Notes

External links
    La journée d'un "Terroriste"
   Discours d'André SANTINI et Henry KARAYAN

Polish Jews who died in the Holocaust
1923 births
1944 deaths
FTP-MOI
Resistance members killed by Nazi Germany
People executed by Germany by firearm
Polish emigrants to France
Jews in the French resistance
French people executed by Nazi Germany
Deaths by firearm in France
Affiche Rouge